John Baird (25 February 1870 – 1905) was a Scottish footballer who played in the Football League for Aston Villa and Leicester Fosse.

References

1870 births
1905 deaths
Scottish footballers
English Football League players
Aston Villa F.C. players
Vale of Leven F.C. players
Leicester City F.C. players
Clyde F.C. players
Kidderminster Harriers F.C. players
Date of death missing
Association football fullbacks
Footballers from West Dunbartonshire
People from Alexandria, West Dunbartonshire

FA Cup Final players